Inverkeithing is a port town and parish, in Fife, Scotland, on the Firth of Forth. A town of ancient origin, Inverkeithing was given royal burgh status during the reign of Malcolm IV in the 12th century. It was an important center of trade during the Middle Ages, and its industrial heritage built on quarrying and ship breaking goes back to the 19th century. In 2016, the town had an estimated population of 4,890, while the civil parish was reported to have a population of 8,090 in 2011.

Today, Inverkeithing is a busy commuter hub: its railway station is a main stop for trains on the Fife Circle Line that runs north from Edinburgh, and it is home to the Ferrytoll Park & Ride, which offers bus connections across the Forth and to the rest of Fife. Inverkeithing lies on the Fife Coastal Path, one of Scotland's Great Trails.

Origin of name
The name is of Scottish Gaelic origin, Inbhir Céitein. Inbhir is a common element in place names with Celtic roots and means "confluence, inflow" (see Aber and Inver), thus "mouth of the Keithing/Céitein". The Keithing is the name of a small river or burn that runs through the southern part of the town. Simon Taylor notes that the name Keithing probably contains the Pictish (Brythonic) *coet, "wood", so the Keithing burn would have meant "stream that runs through or past or issues from woodland". William Watson in 1910 hypothesised an etymological link between the hydronym Keithing and the Welsh cethin, "dusky" (c.f. Bryncethin).

Geography
Modern Inverkeithing is almost contiguous with the neighbouring settlements of Rosyth and Dalgety Bay.

Topographically, Inverkeithing is situated on a raised terrace sloping down towards Inverkeithing Bay, which cuts in to the south of the town, separating it from the North Queensferry peninsula. Its medieval centre lay along High Street and Church Street, but the town has since expanded to encompass areas to the north, east, and west.

Inverkeithing is bypassed by the M90 motorway. The M90 links Fife to Lothian and Edinburgh via the Queensferry Crossing. The town is served by Inverkeithing railway station, a hub for the rail network to and from Fife. Passengers travelling to Edinburgh are carried over the Forth Bridge. Inverkeithing and its hinterland are also served by the Ferrytoll Park & Ride, which provides car parking and access to bus services to Edinburgh city centre, Edinburgh Airport, Livingston, South Gyle, other parts of Fife, as well as links to the Scottish Citylink coach network.

Inverkeithing lies on the Fife Coastal Path, a long-distance footpath designated as one of Scotland's Great Trails. Coming from North Queensferry, the path winds around the Inner Bay, through Inverkeithing proper, and past the Ballast Bank public park towards Dalgety Bay.

Climate

History
Inverkeithing has ancient origins: there is some evidence that during the Roman conquest of Britain, Roman governor Agricola established an encampment in the area between AD 78–87. The town's early history is tied to the founding of a church by a holy man named St Erat, supposedly a follower of St Ninian. Local tradition (recorded in a plaque on the parish church) holds that St Erat founded a church in Inverkeithing in the 5th century, but he might be identical to a 'St Theriot' venerated in nearby Fordell, who is thought to have lived in the 8th century. Because the first written references to St Erat come from the 16th century, they do not provide hard evidence for Inverkeithing's early history, or even for the existence of the saint.

Medieval Period 
Inverkeithing is first documented in 1114, when it is mentioned in the foundation charter of Scone Abbey granted by King Alexander I. In 1163 it appears—as "Innirkeithin"—in Pope Alexander III's summons of the clergy of the British Isles to the Council of Tours. Inverkeithing was made one of Fife's first royal burghs as early as the 1160s, during Malcolm IV's reign, which brought with it legal and trading privileges. The settlement was an obvious choice to be created a burgh, as its location at the narrowest crossing point of the Firth of Forth and its sheltered bay were both strategically important.

One of the earliest accounts of life in Inverkeithing comes from the 14th-century Lanercost Chronicle. At Easter 1282, the Chronicle relates, the parish priest of Inverkeithing had "revived the profane rites of Priapus, collecting young girls from the villages, and compelling them to dance in circles to the honour of Father Bacchus, [...] singing and dancing himself and stirring them to lust by filthy language." When the priest exhibited similar behaviour during Lent, a scandalised citizen stabbed him to death.

The town was the last place that King Alexander III was seen before he died on 19 March 1286. The King had crossed the Forth from Dalmeny in a storm to pay a birthday visit to Queen Yolande, who was staying in Kinghorn. On arriving in Inverkeithing, the party was met by one of the burgesses of the town, Alexander Le Saucier (whose name indicates he was either linked to the King's kitchen, or the master of the local saltpans), who tried to convince the King to stay the night. However, the pleas fell on deaf ears, and Alexander set off into the rainy night with two local guides. The group lost its way near Kinghorn and got separated from the King, who was found dead at the bottom of a steep embankment on the next day, having presumably fallen from his horse.

Edward I ("Longshanks") stayed in Inverkeithing on 2 March 1304 on his return to Scotland during the First War of Scottish Independence. This is evidenced by letters written here as he made his way from Dunfermline to St Andrews.

Throughout much of the Middle Ages, Inverkeithing was an important resting place and staging post for pilgrims. Travelers on their way to the shrines of Saint Margaret in Dunfermline and Saint Andrew in St Andrews would often stop in the town after crossing the Firth of Forth via the Queen's Ferry. A hostel for pilgrims in Inverkeithing is documented as a possession of Dryburgh Abbey as early as 1196. A Franciscan friary was established in Inverkeithing in the mid-14th century, which was also intended to serve religious travelers. It is one of the few remnants of a house of the Greyfriars to have survived in Scotland. Due to Inverkeithing's importance for medieval pilgrims, it is one of the towns along the Fife Pilgrim Way established in 2019.

16th and 17th centuries

In November 1504 there was a plague scare at Dunfermline Palace, and four African women including Ellen More with John Mosman, the court apothecary, came to stay in Inverkeithing before crossing to South Queensferry.

Inverkeithing was one of the few Scottish burghs to have four stone gates—known as "ports"—around its medieval settlement. Stone walls were added in 1557, the last remains of which can still be found on the south side of Roman Road. Until that time, Inverkeithing enjoyed a successful trade in wool, fleece and hides, and served as a hub of commerce for Fife. The town's flourishing was evidenced by its weekly markets and five annual fairs.

However, trade had begun to decrease by the 16th century, and Inverkeithing slowly became poorer than its neighbouring settlements. Due to political and social instability, caused by both plague and war, this downward trend continued in the 17th century. In 1654, Dutch cartographer Joan Blaeu mentions Inverkeithing as "formerly a flourishing market" in his Nova Fifae Descriptio.

Inverkeithing was a hotbed for witch trials in the 17th century. In 1621 six local women were tried for witchcraft in the Tolbooth. Between 1621 and 1652, at least 51 people were executed for witchcraft in Inverkeithing, an unusually large number for a town of this size; the much larger Kirkcaldy only saw 18 executions in the same period. The reason is believed to be a combination of cholera outbreaks, famine, and the appointment of Rev. Walter Bruce—a known witch hunter—as minister of St Peter's. Bruce also played a pivotal role in initiating the so-called Great Scottish witch hunt of 1649–50. The executions were carried out at Witch Knowe to the south of town, which today is partially within Hope Street Cemetery.

On 20 July 1651, the Battle of Inverkeithing was fought on two sites in the area, one north of the town close to Pitreavie Castle, the other to the south on and around the peninsula of North Queensferry and the isthmus connecting it to Inverkeithing. The battle took place during Oliver Cromwell's invasion of the Kingdom of Scotland following the Third English Civil War. It was an attempt by the English Parliamentarian forces to outflank the army of Scottish Covenanters loyal to Charles II at Stirling and get access to the north of Scotland. This was the last major engagement of the Wars of the Three Kingdoms and led to Scotland passing into Cromwell's control. Cromwell's 4,500 troops defeated a Scottish force of roughly equal size, forcing the Covenanters to abandon Stirling and march south to support Charles II. Of the estimated 800 MacLean clansmen who fought in the battle, only 35 were said to have survived, although Covenanter officer Sir James Balfour estimated the clan's losses at around 100. An apocryphal account states that the Pinkerton Burn ran red with blood for three days afterwards. This was a significant episode in the history of Clan MacLean, and the 20th century poet Sorley MacLean mentions Inverkeithing in one of his poems.

Modern era
Daniel Defoe, writing of Inverkeithing in his Tour thro' the Whole Island of Great Britain in 1724, found the town to be "still populous, but decayed, as to what it has formerly been". Defoe also relates that Inverkeithing had briefly become known in England in the early 1700s for a crime of passion in which Robert Balfour, 5th Lord Balfour of Burleigh, murdered an Inverkeithing schoolmaster who had married a woman Balfour loved—the nobleman was later sentenced to death, but escaped captivity by exchanging clothes with his sister. Defoe's sentiments about Inverkeithing were echoed by Sir William Burrell when he toured Scotland in 1758, who found it a "mean, miserable, paultry town, teaching us what to expect from its neighbouring villages". At the time, the parish had a population of over 2,200, and industry had become both smaller in scale and more diverse. Lead and coal were mined, with coal being exported in substantial quantities. There was an iron foundry and, by the late 18th century, the town had a brewery, tan works, soap works, a salt pan and timber works. A whisky distillery, using the water of Keithing Burn, was opened in 1795, and operated until the mid-19th century. Its buildings, near the railway line in Keith Place, were later used for oil works. The importance of fishing declined in line with increasing industrialisation and, by 1891, Inverkeithing only had 14 resident fishermen.

In 1821, merchant and politician Sir Robert Preston directed the development of Preston Crescent, a new road to the south of the town on the banks of the Inner Bay. Alongside a small stone bridge (today a C-listed building), a number of plain classical houses were built to accommodate retired sea captains, with most of the buildings surviving to this day. Nearby Preston Hill is also named for Sir Robert, who erected a flagpole there intended to aid marine traffic.

By the mid-19th century quarrying, engineering and shipbuilding were major industries in the area and, in 1831, the population increased by over 600 in a decade, due to an influx of labourers employed in greenstone quarries. The quarries provided material for major works, such as the extension of Leith Pier and some of the piers of the Forth Bridge. By 1870, engineering and shipbuilding had largely ceased, and the harbour lost freight traffic to the railways. As a result, Inverkeithing was no longer on a through route for freight. The opening of the Forth Bridge in 1890, however, led to another surge in population and new building. By 1925, quarrying remained a major operation and, whilst the saltworks, iron foundry and sawmill had closed, a papermaking industry had developed at the harbour. Caldwell's paper mill would remain in operation until 2003, with the factory being demolished in 2012.

At the beginning of the 20th century, Inverkeithing became known for its shipbreaking at Thos. W. Ward's yard on the Inner Bay. Among others, the revolutionary battleship HMS Dreadnought was dismantled there in 1923, as was the hull of the Titanic's sister ship RMS Olympic in 1937, the Nazi Party cruise ship Robert Ley in 1947, and the second RMS Mauretania in 1966. Today, the yard is a metal recycling facility.

Landmarks

St. Peter's Church

The B-listed parish church of St. Peter stands in its large churchyard on the east side of Church Street. The church was founded by Waltheof of Allerdale, son of Gospatrick, as a wooden Celtic church before being adapted into a Norman stone structure, which was bequeathed by the monks of Dunfermline Abbey in 1139. The Norman foundations were reused for the 13th century Gothic structure, and a tower was added in the 14th century. In pre-Reformation times the church had altars to St. Michael, the Holy Blood, John the Baptist, St. Catherine, the Holy Rood, St. Laurence, St. Ninian and St. Mary. In 1611 it absorbed the adjacent parish of Rosyth.

Extensive fire damage in 1825 reduced it to the height of its lower window sills, although the tower survived, but it was rebuilt. The main part of the church is thus a large plain neo-Gothic 'preaching box' of 1826–27, designed by James Gillespie Graham. Built of soft sandstone, the tower—the only remaining part of the pre-Reformation church—is very weathered, and has been partially refaced. The tower is crowned by a lead-covered spire from 1835 designed by Thomas Bonnar, whose elaborate gabled dormers saw clock faces being added in 1883. The church's roomy interior—now deprived of its galleries—is graced by one of the finest medieval furnishings to survive in any Scottish parish church. This is the large and well-preserved sandstone font of around 1398, which was rediscovered buried under the church, having been concealed at the Reformation. Its octagonal bowl is decorated with angels holding heraldic shields. These include the royal arms of the King of Scots, and of Queen Anabella Drummond, the consort of King Robert III. The high quality of the carving is explained by it being a royal gift to the parish church, Inverkeithing being a favourite residence of Queen Anabella. Most of the interior visible today was designed by Peter MacGregor Chalmers and dates from 1900. Notable ministers include Robert Roche (Moderator of the General Assembly of the Church of Scotland in 1613) and witch hunter Walter Bruce, who served the unique church role of 'Constant Moderator' from 1662 until 1673.

Hospitium of the Grey Friars

The heart of the medieval town is around the High Street and Church Street. On the High Street is one of the best surviving examples of a friary building in Scotland, the category-A listed Hospitium of the Grey Friars (also known as the Franciscan order). The friary may date from the late 13th century, with a charter in 1268 mentioning the building of a church and convent for the Franciscans. There are no further mentions of the friary until 1384, but at the time, it would have been a thriving hub for pilgrims to Dunfermline and St Andrews, comprising accommodations, cloisters, storage cellars, and a chapel. The friary was sold to a private buyer in 1559 during the Scottish Reformation and remodeled into a tenement. The hospitium visible today once formed the west end of the friary, and it was the only building preserved during the 16th-century alterations, while the rest of the complex was used as a quarry. An antiquarian renovation in 1932–1935 restored the 14th-century details for which there was evidence, and otherwise retained the 17th-century finishes. The building was originally cruciform, but only its central part remains, including several tunnel vaults formerly used for storage. The foundations of the north range of the complex, together with a well and several cellars, can be seen in the public gardens next to the hospitium. The building is now mainly used as a community centre.

Other landmarks
Inverkeithing contains one of the finest remaining examples of a mercat cross in Scotland. The cross, a category-A listed monument, is believed to have been built as a memorial of the marriage between the Duke of Rothesay and the daughter of the Earl of Douglas. Originally, the cross stood on the north end of the High Street, before moving to face the Tolbooth and then to its present site at the junction between Bank Street and High Street, further up the road. As of 2021, there are plans to move it to a more prominent position in the Market Square, as part of a £3.6 million, five-year programme of improvements to the town centre. The core of the mercat cross is thought to date from the late 14th century, with the octagonal shaft from the 16th century. Two of the shields on the cross bear the arms of Queen Anabella Drummond and the Douglas family. Later, a unicorn and a shield depicting the St Andrew's Cross were added in 1688, the work of John Boyd of South Queensferry.

Located on Bank Street, between numbers 2–4, is Thomsoun's House, which dates from 1617 and was reconstructed in 1965. Its carved sandstone pediment includes thistle-shaped finials and the initials of the first owners John Thomson ("I.T.") and Bessie Thomsoun ("B.T.").

Opposite St Peter's Church is the A-listed L-plan tower house known as Fordell's Lodging, which dates from 1671 and was built by Sir John Henderson of Fordell. On King Street is the much altered B-listed Rosebery House, once owned by the Rosebery family, and possibly the oldest surviving house in the burgh. The unusual monopitch lean-to roof is locally known as a 'toofall', and dates the house to no later than the early 16th century. It was owned by the Earl of Dunbar before being purchased by the Earl of Rosebery.

On Townhall Street is the A-listed Inverkeithing Town House (also known as the Tolbooth), which displays the old town coat of arms above the front door. The Renaissance tower, at the western end of the building, is the oldest part of the tolbooth, dating from 1755. A three-storey classical building followed in 1770 as a replacement for the previous tolbooth. This consists of a prison or the 'black hole' on the ground floor, the court room on the middle and the debtors' prison on the top.

Governance
Inverkeithing forms part of the Dunfermline and West Fife Westminster constituency, as of 2021 held by Douglas Chapman MP for the Scottish National Party (SNP). For the Scottish Parliament Inverkeithing forms part of the Cowdenbeath constituency which falls within the Mid Scotland and Fife electoral region. As of 2021, the constituency is represented by Annabelle Ewing, also of the SNP.

Culture and education
The town hosted Inverkeithing United from 1906 to 1963, winners of the Scottish Junior Cup in 1912–13. The club played at Ballast Bank on the Inner Bay until 2021, when the home games were moved to Dalgety Bay; the condition of the grounds at Inverkeithing would otherwise prevent promotion to the Lowland League.

The Ballast Bank grounds also play host to Inverkeithing's annual highland games, which have been staged since at least 1914, and which draw crowds of up to 5000 spectators. In 2014, the Inverkeithing Highland Games were featured in season 7, episode 1 of the US television show Duck Dynasty, in which cast members participated in some of the events.

The town is served by Inverkeithing Primary School and Inverkeithing High School, both located on Hillend Road to the northeast of the town centre. The high school's catchment area includes most of the surrounding towns such as Dalgety Bay, Rosyth, and North Queensferry, resulting in a school population of over 1,500. The original primary school—a C-listed building from 1894, located behind Fordell's Lodging—was destroyed by a fire in 2018, after having been disused for a number of years.

Notable people
 Richard de Inverkeithing, 13th-century cleric, Chamberlain of King Alexander II and Bishop of Dunkeld
 Gordon Durie, ex East Fife, Glasgow Rangers, Chelsea and Scotland striker, studied at Inverkeithing High School
 Samuel Greig, Russian admiral and "Father of the Russian Navy"
 Stephen Hendry MBE, former professional snooker player and multiple world champion, went to Inverkeithing High School
 Craig Levein, footballer, Scotland manager 2009–2014, manager at Heart of Midlothian 2017–2019, studied at Inverkeithing High School
 Sir Duncan McDonald FRSE, engineer and industrialist
 Natalie McGarry, SNP politician and former Member of Parliament (MP) for Glasgow East
 Robert Moffat, missionary to Africa and father-in-law of explorer David Livingstone, lived here during his early years
 David Spence, recipient of the Victoria Cross for his actions during the Indian Rebellion of 1857
 Rev Alexander Stoddart Wilson, minister and botanist, died in Inverkeithing and is buried there

See also
Inverkeithing (Parliament of Scotland constituency)
List of places in Fife

References

External links
 Gazetteer for Scotland webpages for Inverkeithing
 Inverkeithing on FifeDirect

 
Ports and harbours of Scotland
Royal burghs
Towns in Fife
Scottish parliamentary locations and buildings
Parishes in Fife
Populated coastal places in Scotland